Bosar Jan (also Romanized as Bosār Jān) is a village in Beyza Rural District, Beyza District, Sepidan County, Fars Province, Iran. At the 2006 census, its population was 339, in 86 families.

References 

Populated places in Beyza County